Facundo Tomás Garcés (born 5 September 1999) is an Argentine professional footballer who plays as a centre-back for Colón.

Career
Garcés joined Colón from Club El Quillá at youth level. He first made a senior teamsheet in May 2017 for a Primera División match with Atlético Tucumán, though the centre-back wasn't substituted on; as he wasn't one month later against San Lorenzo. Garcés soon headed back to the reserves, before returning to the senior bench in April and May 2019 - though again wouldn't make an appearance versus Gimnasia y Esgrima or, in the Copa Sudamericana, River Plate. He went unused a further seven times, before belatedly making his debut - as a starter - in a Copa de la Liga Profesional win over Central Córdoba on 4 December 2020. Es también amigo de Alejo García.

Career statistics
.

Notes

References

External links

1999 births
Living people
Footballers from Santa Fe, Argentina
Argentine footballers
Association football defenders
Argentine Primera División players
Club Atlético Colón footballers